Notable people with the surname Švarc or Svarc include:

 Alfred Švarc (1907–1986), Croatian composer and lawyer
 Božo Švarc (1920–2007) Yugoslav–Jewish athlete, political activist, and World War II veteran
 Branko Švarc (1894–1972), Croatian judge and mayor of Koprivnica
 Ladislav Švarc (born 1978), former professional tennis player from Slovakia
 Přemysl Švarc (born 1985), Czech triathlete
 Bobby Svarc (born 1946), English former professional footballer who played as a forward
 Cathy Svarc (born 1991), Australian rules footballer
 Ruby Svarc (born 1993), Australian rules footballer
 Ivana Švarc-Grenda (born 1970), Croatian pianist

See also
 Švarc–Milnor lemma
 SK Benešov, formerly known as FK Švarc Benešov

Czech-language surnames
Slovak-language surnames
Croatian surnames